Lac de Madamète is a lake in Hautes-Pyrénées, France. At an elevation of 2299 m, its surface area is 0.026 km².

Lakes of Hautes-Pyrénées